Arkady L. Bukh (born July 25, 1972) is an American criminal defense attorney. He is best known for representing Azamat Tazhayakov, a college student charged with conspiring to obstruct justice and obstructing justice with the intent to impede a terrorism investigation in the aftermath of the Boston Marathon bombing.

Boston Marathon bombing
Bukh represented Azamat Tazhayakov, one of the alleged co-conspirators in the Boston Marathon bombing. He was convicted in April 2014. The 19-year-old from Kazakhstan attended the University of Massachusetts-Dartmouth with Dzhokhar Tsarnaev, the accused bomber. Tazhayakov was arrested and indicted for charges associated with evidence tampering.

Cyber crime
Bukh has also represented international hackers, like Igor Klopov, Oleg Nikolaenko, Dmitry Naskovets, Vlad Horohorin, Vladimir Tsastsin, Aleksandr Panin, Maxym Shinkarenko, and others.

Vladimir Tsastsin
Vladimir Tsastsin led an Estonian group that was able to place banners on the websites of unsuspecting webmasters, which resulted in payment for any clicks going not to the site owner but to the fraudsters. Additionally, Tsastsin was able to manipulate queries and ads and resell them. Despite being acquitted of all charges in Estonian court in December, 2013, Tsastsin was extradited to the U.S. in October, 2014. He faces multiple counts of fraud and money laundering in the Southern District of New York.

Aleksandr Panin
Russian citizen Aleksandr Panin created the SpyEye Trojan that was used to attack online bank accounts. Panin was arrested in 2013 while on vacation in the Dominican Republic. Trapped in an FBI sting, Panin was extradited to the U.S, on charges of distributing SpyEye between 2009 and 2011.

Panin, who seemed to have been on Interpol’s notorious “[Interpol notice#Notice types|red list],” was wanted for embezzlement through cyber-fraud totaling $5 million.

Russian authorities called the actions by U.S. authorities completely “unacceptable.”

Igor Klopov
Igor Klopov targeted Forbes 400 individuals, including a close friend of former President George W. Bush. Klopov was charged by New York State in 2007 and sentenced to 3.5 to 10.5 years in prison.

Using the Forbes 400 list, Klopov was accused of stealing more than $1.5 million. Running the operation from his Moscow home, Klopov mined the internet for information about potential victims including Texas billionaire Charles J. Wyly Jr, a friend of then-President George W. Bush.

Four of Klopov's accomplices were subsequently arrested and pleaded guilty. Klopov's group targeted Texas and California where property and deed information can be found online. Able to get information about property values and mortgage sizes, the group was able to focus on targets with generally large lines of credit.

Oleg Nikolaenko
Oleg Nikolaenko, dubbed “King of Spam” by the FBI. Nikolaenko was responsible for one-third of the world's spam before being arrested in 2009.

The FBI's break came in its investigation in August 2009, when Jody Smith of Missouri pleaded guilty to selling counterfeit Rolex watches. Using grand jury subpoenas, U.S. federal agents traced $459,000 in payments to Nikolaenko.

When Nikolaenko made a second trip to Las Vegas to attend the 2010 SEMA show, he was picked up by federal agents at the Bellagio Hotel and found to be carrying two passports and $4,000 in cash. Prosecutors say that world-wide spam dropped by 17 percent during the period Nikolaenko was detained.

Nikolaenko was sentenced to time served in 2013.

Vladislav Horohorin
Horohorin Vladislav was described by the US Secret Service as one of its five most wanted cyber criminals globally. Horohorin was one of the founders of CarderPlanet online board connecting cyber criminals around the world where they facilitated the trade. He was notorious for selling “dumps”, information encoded on the magnetic stripe of a credit card. Promoting his operations with video cartoons ridiculing American card holders. Horohorin was arrested in France in 2010 and extradited to the U.S. in 2012. He was sentenced to 88 months in prison and $125,739 in restitution.

Mikhail Rytikov
In 2013, a federal indictment in the District of New Jersey charged Mikhail Rytikov and four others with conspiring in a worldwide hacking scheme that targeted major corporate networks and stealing over 160 million credit card numbers. It is estimated that hundreds of millions of dollars was stolen, making it the largest such scheme ever prosecuted in the U.S.

The five men supposedly sought corporate victims who were engaged in financial transactions, retailers that received and sent financial data and other businesses that utilized information the men felt they could exploit. The targets of the attacks included NASDAQ, 7-Eleven, Carrefour, Hannaford, Dexia, JetBlue, Dow Jones & Company and others.

Rytikov, 27, of Odessa, Ukraine is still at large.

Maksim Shynkarenko

Shynkarenko, of Kharkiv, Ukraine is the most significant distributor of child pornography ever prosecuted in America according to American law enforcement authorities. Shynkarenko was indicted in 2008 by the Grand Jury for the New Jersey District and charged in 2012 with operating a network of websites. Pleading guilty to operating a child-exploitation enterprise in connection with the website which he ran from 2005 until 2008, Shynkarenko's website led to convictions in 47 states. Over 600 U.S.-based customers, including 30 men from New Jersey have been convicted in connection with the investigation into Shynkarenko's website.

Shynkarenko was arrested in 2009 while on vacation in Thailand and held for extradition to America. Shynkarenko fought extradition for three years and finally appeared in federal court.

In January, 2014, he pleaded guilty to all charges. He was sentenced to 30 years.

Michail Sorodsky
Sorodsky, 63, was sentenced to six years after he admitted to raping a sedated patient and sexually molesting seven others. Sorodsky portrayed himself as a “holistic healer” who would treat female patients who had been diagnosed with cancer. Using a probiotic yogurt, he would fondle the women and claim it was “treatment.”

Pretending to be a doctor in the Sheepshead community, Sorodsky would charge women up to $1,000 a visit. When Rimma Klots’ mother went for a “treatment” from Sorodsky, her daughter Rimma thought the method of treatment was a little different and decided to set up a sting-operation.

Posing as a patient, she visited Sorodsky. The younger Klots went to the licensing board when the treatment she received from Sorodsky consisted of getting a pelvic and breast exam.

When Sorodsky is released he will have to register as a sex offender, be subject to 10 years of supervised parole and wear personal monitoring equipment.

Other notable cases

Lak Vokra
Lak Vokra, a Manhattan real estate mogul was accused of raping a woman that he had met on a “sugar daddy” website. Vokra, stocky and bearded, had often posted images on his website and Facebook page showing him partying and socializing. The criminal case against Vokra was dropped in August, 2013.

A former Manhattan real estate mogul, Vokra, was accused of attacking his date inside his posh Wall Street apartment. The two had met through the dating site before agreeing to meet at Vohra's home at 37 Wall Street.

Alexander Yakovlev
Alexander Yakovlev, former director of the United Nations’ Oil-for-Food Programme in Iraq was accused of taking kickbacks totaling almost $1 million from UN contractors. In 2010 Yakovlev was sentenced to time served, 2 years of supervised release and was ordered to forfeit $900,000.

Victor Koltun
Victor Koltun, a Brooklyn rabbi, was charged with a double murder-for-hire plot that left two Newburgh men dead. Koltun paid to have former police officer Francis Piscopo and his nephew Gerald killed to avoid paying a debt. Following 3 and a half years of delays, the jury convicted Koltun for the murders he orchestrated in an effort to avoid paying a debt. Koltun was eventually sentenced to two consecutive sentences of life in prison with no chance for parole.

The shooter in the murders, Frank Lewis pleaded guilty in 2011 and is serving 12.5 to 25 years in prison.

References

External links
Law Offices of Bukh & Associates
Bukh Global Partners

1972 births
Living people
Criminal defense lawyers
New York (state) lawyers
Jewish American attorneys
New York University School of Law alumni
Lawyers from Baku
American people of Azerbaijani-Jewish descent
American people of Russian-Jewish descent
21st-century American Jews